Not Without My Daughter may refer to:

Not Without My Daughter (book), a 1987 book by Betty Mahmoody
Not Without My Daughter (film), a 1991 adaptation of the book, directed by Brian Gilbert
"Not Without My Daughter" (Arrested Development), a 2004 TV episode
"Not Without My Daughter" (The Sarah Silverman Program), a 2007 TV episode